William Hayes Googins (August 20, 1838 – May 1, 1926) was a Union veteran of the American Civil War.  He was a soldier in the 27th Maine Regiment known for its controversial, and later revoked, Medals of Honor.

Biography
William Googins was born on August 20, 1838 in Old Orchard now Old Orchard Beach, Maine. He was the seventh child and fourth son of Nathaniel Littlefield Googins (1798–1879) and Lucy Thurston (1803–1870). He spent most of his early life in Old Orchard.

Googins enlisted in the volunteer 27th Maine Infantry Regiment as a private in Company A, and was mustered into service on September 30, 1862. He was one of 300 or so people to remain in service after their term expired.

After the war, William Googins married Priscilla Libby Prescott (1848–1886) – a descendant of many royal families. Their union produced six children;
 Maude Lucy (1869–?) Maude modeled for some of Winslow Homer's paintings.
 Roswell Sumner (1871–1966)
 Charlotte Hannah (1873–1965)
 Lawrence Melville (1877–1900) Died in the Boxer Rebellion
 Helen Mildred (1878–1971)
 Priscilla May (1886–1887)

Medal of Honor
After being ordered to the rear for muster out, over 300 men of the 27th Maine Regiment agreed to remain beyond their service time in the defenses of Washington, DC during the Gettysburg Campaign. The lack of an agreeable list of those who stayed behind in Washington resulted in all members of the Regiment controversially receiving the Medal of Honor. In 1917 the U.S. Congress purged these medals.

See also

 List of Medal of Honor recipients

Bibliography

References

External links
 
 
 

1838 births
1926 deaths
People of Maine in the American Civil War
Union Army soldiers
People from Old Orchard Beach, Maine
Purged Medal of Honor recipients